Rae Lynn Job (born May 2, 1948) is a former Democratic member of the Wyoming Senate, representing the 12th district from 1997 until 2008. During her final term she served as the Minority Whip.

External links
Wyoming State Legislature - Senator Rae Lynn Job official WY Senate website
Project Vote Smart - Senator Rae Lynn Job (WY) profile
Follow the Money - Rae Lynn Job
2006 2004 20021998  1992 1990 campaign contributions

Democratic Party Wyoming state senators
1948 births
Living people
Women state legislators in Wyoming
21st-century American women